A Small Good Thing is Bocephus King's second album, released by New West Records in 1998. The album was marketed as country.Sure, argues Perry, there's a smattering of that within A Small Good Thing, but not enough to ghettoize him within that one genre. "It got great reviews," says Perry, "[but] it got stuffed into places it didn't belong. People are going, "This isn't f-ing country!" The situation was exacerbated in Canada, where the CD "spent most of its life in warehouses."

The light at the end of the tunnel appeared at SXSW in the form of an editor from Buscadero, a popular Italian music magazine. Unbeknownst to Perry, the editor was bowled over, and he then returned to Italy with a mission: to inform Europe of the genius of Bocephus King. Perry didn't know what was brewing when he was later interviewed for Buscadero, nor when a European promoter called and booked a tour for him. After apprehensively walking onto a stage in Italy and finding that the crowd knew the words to all his songs, it dawned on him: Bocephus King had quietly become huge in Europe. "We did one big outdoor concert where I thought we were part of a huge festival," says Perry, "and it was just us."Calgary Straight 2001 Article by Rick Overwater

Artist Information and Track Listing
A Small Good Thing
1998 New West Records

Bocephus King: Vocals, 6 & 12 string acoustic guitars, electric guitar, percussion, tympany.

The Rigalattos
Dan Parry: Drums, percussion, b.g’s.
Darren Paris: Bass, b.g’s.
Doug Fujisawa: Piano, organ, b.g’s.
Paul Rigby: Electric guitar, mandolin, gut string, b.g’s.

Additional musicians
Dave Staniforth: acoustic guitar, electric guitar, synther. Craig Ducommun: piano, organ, synther, harmonica. Jesse Zubot: violin, mandolin. Steve Dawson: weissenborn, 6 & 12 string acoustic guitars, electric guitar, slide, pedalsteel. Brent Sigmeth: b.g’s. Elliot Polsky: percussion. Doug Schmidt: Accordion. Joyita Rubin: cello. Jed Luhmann: chimes, marimba. Lori Williams: background vocals. Kristin Mooney: background vocals. Jane Sawyer: background vocals.

Track listing
What am I doing here?
A small good thing
The haunting of a New York moon
Blues for Buddy Bolden
Hours before light
Ruby
Nowhere at all
I’ll die in mine
Think about you
Tired of waiting
Heart like yours
Land of plenty

References

1998 albums
Bocephus King albums